Karl Michael Blessinger (21 September 1888 in Ulm – 13 March 1962 in Pullach, München) was a German composer.
He joined the Nazi Party in 1932.

References

German composers
Nazi Party members
1888 births
1962 deaths